Nie Chunyu (born July 1955) is a former Chinese politician from Shanxi province. He served on the province's party Standing Committee, and as the Secretary-General of the Party Committee, a position responsible for the coordination and execution of routine party work. Prior to that he served as the Head of the party's provincial United Front Work Department, and Party Secretary of Lüliang. He was removed from office in August 2014 along with several high-ranking colleagues, and placed under investigation for corruption by the party's anti-graft agency.

Career
Nie was born and raised in Houma, Shanxi, he graduated from Liaoning Technical University, majoring in surveying.

He got involved in politics in October 1976 and joined the Chinese Communist Party in August 1973.

After college, he was assigned to Houma as local official. Beginning in 1984, he served in several posts in Shanxi, including division head, director, and party secretary.

In March 2004 he became the Deputy CPC Party Chief of Lüliang, rising to Party Chief in 2006. He also served as the mayor of Lüliang between July 2004 to February 2006. In January 2011, he was elevated to the head of the United Front Work Department of the provincial Party committee and became a Standing Committee member of the CPC Shanxi Committee. Two years later, he became secretary general of the standing committee.

Downfall
On August 23, 2014, Nie Chunyu was being investigated by the Central Commission for Discipline Inspection for "serious violations of laws and regulations". On August 28, he was removed from office. The Central Commission for Discipline Inspection concluded on February 3, 2015, that Nie had "used the convenience of his office to seek gain for others and took a huge amount of bribes, took monetary and other gifts; and committed adultery." On October 19, 2016, Nie was sentenced to 15 years for guilty of bribery.

References

1955 births
Living people
People's Republic of China politicians from Shanxi
Politicians from Linfen
Mayors of Lüliang
Political office-holders in Shanxi
Liaoning Technical University alumni
Chinese Communist Party politicians from Shanxi
Expelled members of the Chinese Communist Party
Chinese politicians convicted of corruption